Joaquín Ibáñez (born 18 July 1995) is an Argentine professional footballer who plays as a left midfielder for Flandria.

Career
Ibáñez's first professional club was Primera B Nacional side Chacarita Juniors, he played in their youth system prior to making his first-team debut in 2015. His bow for Chacarita came on 2 April 2015 in a 1–0 Copa Argentina win against Atlas. He signed a new contract in December 2015. It took two years for Ibáñez to make his league debut, it arrived in May 2017 versus All Boys. In that season, he went onto play seven times in total as Chacarita won promotion to the Argentine Primera División. His first top-flight appearance came on 10 September against Tigre. Ibáñez scored his first goal on 23 March 2019 versus Guillermo Brown.

In September 2020, Flandria of Primera B Metropolitana completed the signing of Ibáñez.

Career statistics
.

References

External links

1995 births
Living people
People from San Martín, Buenos Aires
Argentine footballers
Argentine Primera División players
Chacarita Juniors footballers
Flandria footballers
Sportspeople from Buenos Aires Province